The Boston Mountains is a Level III ecoregion designated by the Environmental Protection Agency (EPA) in the U.S. states of Arkansas and Oklahoma. Part of the Ozarks, the Boston Mountains are a deeply dissected plateau. The ecoregion is steeper than the adjacent Springfield Plateau to the north, and bordered on the south by the Arkansas Valley. The Oklahoma portion of the range is locally referred to as the Cookson Hills.  There are several theories of how the mountains were named, though apparently none are related to the Massachusetts city.

The Boston Mountains ecoregion has been subdivided into two Level IV ecoregions.

Description
The ecoregion is mountainous, forested, and underlain by Pennsylvanian sandstone, shale, and siltstone. It is one of the Ozark Plateaus; some folding and faulting has occurred but, in general, strata are much less deformed than in the Ouachita Mountains. Maximum elevations are higher, soils have a warmer temperature regime, and carbonate rocks are much less extensive than in the Ozark Highlands. Physiography is distinct from the Arkansas Valley. Upland soils are mostly Ultisols that developed under oak-hickory and oak-hickory-pine forests. Today, forests are still widespread; northern red oak, southern red oak, white oak, and hickories usually dominate the uplands, but shortleaf pine grows on drier, south- and west-facing slopes underlain by sandstone. Pastureland or hayland occur on nearly level ridgetops, benches, and valley floors. Population density is low; recreation, logging, and livestock farming are the primary land uses. Water quality in streams is generally exceptional; biochemical, nutrient, and mineral water quality parameter concentrations all tend to be very low. Fish communities are mostly composed of sensitive species; a diverse, often darter-dominated community occurs along with nearly equal proportions of minnows and sunfishes. During low flows, streams usually run clear but, during high flow conditions, turbidity in the Boston Mountains tends to be greater than in the Ouachitas. Summer flow in many small streams is limited or non-existent but isolated, enduring pools may occur.

Geology and physiography
The Boston Mountains are a physiographic section of the larger Ozark Plateaus province, which in turn is part of the larger Interior Highlands physiographic division.

The area is underlain by Pennsylvanian sandstone, shale, and siltstone, where some folding and faulting has occurred. The sandstone beds become thinner, but more shaly in the west as the mountains decline in elevation.

The rocks of the region are essentially little disturbed, flat-lying sedimentary layers of the Paleozoic age. The highest ridges and peaks are capped by Pennsylvanian sandstone and shale. The deeply eroded valleys are cut into Mississippian limestones and below that layer Ordovician dolomites.

General description
The Boston Mountains form the southwestern part of the Ozark plateau where they are the highest  portion of the Ozarks. Turner Ward Knob (TWK) is the highest named peak. Nearby, five unnamed peaks have elevations at or slightly above .

Rivers and streams
The Boston Mountains are the source of rivers and streams that flow out from the mountains in all directions. Within a  radius of a point just west of the summits discussed above are located the sources of the White River, the Buffalo River, the Kings River, War Eagle Creek, and Little Mulberry Creek. Other rivers and streams having their headwaters in the Boston Mountains include the Illinois River, the Mulberry River, Lee Creek, Frog Bayou, Big Piney Creek, Illinois Bayou, and the Little Red River.  To the south, the Arkansas River valley separates the Boston Mountains from the Ouachita Mountains.

In Arkansas, the Boston Mountains are found in the following counties: Boone, Carroll, Cleburne, Conway, Crawford, Franklin, Independence, Johnson, Madison, Newton, Pope, Searcy, Stone, Van Buren, and Washington.

In Oklahoma, the Boston Mountains are found in these counties: Adair, Cherokee, Muskogee, Sequoyah, and Wagoner.

Gallery

Landscapes

See also
 Cookson Hills
 Sam's Throne
 Ecoregions defined by the EPA and the Commission for Environmental Cooperation:
 List of ecoregions in North America (CEC)
 List of ecoregions in the United States (EPA)
 List of ecoregions in Arkansas
 List of ecoregions in Oklahoma
 The conservation group World Wildlife Fund maintains an alternate classification system:
 List of ecoregions (WWF)
 List of ecoregions in the United States (WWF)

References

External links
Boston Mountain MLRA description.
 Encyclopedia of Oklahoma History and Culture -" Boston Mountains"

Ecoregions of the United States
Ecoregions of Arkansas
 
 
Landforms of the Ozarks
Landforms of Boone County, Arkansas
Landforms of Carroll County, Arkansas
Landforms of Cleburne County, Arkansas
Landforms of Conway County, Arkansas
Landforms of Crawford County, Arkansas
Landforms of Franklin County, Arkansas
Landforms of Independence County, Arkansas
Landforms of Johnson County, Arkansas
Landforms of Madison County, Arkansas
Landforms of Newton County, Arkansas
Landforms of Pope County, Arkansas
Landforms of Searcy County, Arkansas
Landforms of Stone County, Arkansas
Landforms of Van Buren County, Arkansas
Landforms of Washington County, Arkansas
Landforms of Adair County, Oklahoma
Landforms of Cherokee County, Oklahoma
Landforms of Muskogee County, Oklahoma
Landforms of Sequoyah County, Oklahoma
Landforms of Wagoner County, Oklahoma
Mountain ranges of Arkansas
Mountain ranges of Oklahoma
Ozark–St. Francis National Forest
Physiographic sections
Regions of Arkansas
Regions of Oklahoma
U.S. Interior Highlands
White River (Arkansas–Missouri)
Plateaus of the United States